The Court of Appeal of Prince Edward Island (also known as the Prince Edward Island Court of Appeal, and as PECA in legal abbreviation) is the appellate court for the Canadian province of Prince Edward Island, and thus the senior provincial court below the Supreme Court of Canada.  As the number of appeals heard by the Supreme Court of Canada is extremely limited, the Court of Appeal is in practice the court of final appeal for most residents of Prince Edward Island.

The Court is composed of three judges, led by the Chief Justice of Prince Edward Island, currently David H. Jenkins. At any given time there may be one or more additional justices who sit as supernumerary justices.
The Court of Appeal derives its jurisdiction from Prince Edward Island's Judicature Act, enacted in its current form in 2008.

History and functions

Prior to 2008 reforms that were formally implemented in 2009, the senior appellate body in Prince Edward Island was the Supreme Court of Prince Edward Island (Appeal Division).  With the passage of the Judicature Act, the Supreme Court was stripped of its appellate functions, now assigned to the Court of Appeal, while the Supreme Court of Prince Edward Island remained as a single-division superior court.  All members of the former Appeal Division became the justices of the Court of Appeal.

The Court of Appeals hears appeals from the Provincial Court of Prince Edward Island on indictable criminal matters as well as appeals from decisions made by the Supreme Court of Prince Edward Island.

The Appeal Division sits in Charlottetown, Prince Edward Island, in the Sir Louis Henry Davies Law Courts.

Pursuant to the Constitution Act, 1867, the Court of Appeal is operated by the provincial government, while its justices are appointed by the Governor General of Canada, on the advice of the Prime Minister of Canada.

Current membership

Chief Justices of PEI

References

External links
Prince Edward Island Courts

Prince Edward Island
Prince Edward Island courts